Hanky Panky (Mandarin: 大釣哥) is a 2017 Taiwanese comedy film directed by Huang Chao-liang  and starring Chu Ke-liang in his final film role. Lan Cheng-lung and Aggie Hsieh also star. The film was released in theaters on January 26, 2017.

Cast

Chu Ke-liang as Lan Da-diao (Brother Diao / Coach Lan)  	 
Lan Cheng-lung as Lan Hsiao-lung
Aggie Hsieh as Huang Hsin-yi
Wu Pong-fong as Black Bear
Kenji Wu as Chang Shih-pang
Yang Kuei-mei as Pai Hsiu-chuan   	 
Michael Huang as Chang Kuo-liang  
Grace Lin as Little Chili
Hope Lin as Yen Ya-ting   	 
Yang Lieh as Shark  	 
Liao Chin-te as Shark's sidekick
Gary Tseng as Shark's sidekick
Ma Kuo-pi as Noodle stall owner 
Angela Lee as Lan Da-diao's wife 
Chiu Yi-feng as Water Frog
Hsieh Chi-wen as Mouse
Andy Bian as Four Heavenly King
Clover Kao
Yuan Liu as Postman

Soundtrack

Featured song

Re-release
Hanky Panky was re-released on May 26, 2017 during the Dragon Boat Festival holiday, after strong demands by fans of the late Chu Ke-liang who launched a campaign that calls for the film to be released again in theaters.
 The film grossed NT$1 million in the first five days of its re-release in Taiwan.

References

External links

2017 films
Taiwanese-language films
2010s Mandarin-language films
Taiwanese comedy films
2017 comedy films